Australian rules football has been played at an organised amateur level in the United States and Canada since around 1990.  There have also been clubs formed for occasional play in Bermuda, Brazil, Chile, Argentina and Colombia.

Argentina
Australian rules football has been played in Buenos Aires, Argentina since 1997, the Asociación Argentina de Futbol Australiano as the de facto governing body.

Ricardo Acuña, having seen footage of the game in the 1990s, decided to start the game in Argentina and is now president of the Argentine Alternative Sports Association.  The Argentine Australian Football Association (AAFAU) was founded and competition started in 1997 with a group of 3 teams consisting of about 30 or 40 mainly rugby union players.  The league grew to four senior sides in Buenos Aires, with Under 19s sides associated with each senior team, and a growing number of juniors and school squads reported to be in creation.  Serious competition began in 1999.

A 'Convicts Tour' of amateur footballer from Australia was planned in 2006 in an effort to see Argentina compete in the 2008 Australian Football International Cup, although this tour was later cancelled.

The first international match between Argentina and Chile was played in May 2008 in Buenos Aires, with the Santiago Saints winning. 

On the 23 October 2010, Australian amateur sports touring team the Australian Convicts defeated the national team of Argencina 24 to 18 as part of its South American tour.

Barbados

Australian rules is not currently played in Barbados, however there has been a player in the AFL with strong connections to Barbados - Josh Gibson.

Notable Players

Bermuda
Australian rules football has been played on the island of Bermuda since 2005, when the Bermuda Lions were created.

The island was to host the first Bermuda Australian Football Championships in 2007, featuring teams from Europe and North America in addition to local players.  This tournament was later postponed indefinitely.

Brazil
Australian Rules in Brazil began in 2009 with the creation of a side dubbed 'The Carnaval', composed mainly of Australians resident across the country.

The Carnaval were coordinated by Australian Trade Commissioner Greg Wallis, who took up the challenge of creating a Brazilian side for a match against Chile's Santiago Saints after meeting with Saints President Robert Spurr. The first match between the Saints and Carnaval took place in Rio de Janeiro on June 20, 2009.   A match in Buenos Aires against the Argentine national team is planned for later in 2009.

On the 13 April 2011, Australian amateur sports team the Australian Convicts played against the Brazilian national team in Rio as part of its South American tour.

Canada

Australian rules football is played at an organised level in the provinces of Ontario, British Columbia, Quebec and Alberta.  The Canadian national team has competed at all three Australian Football International Cups to date. AFL Ontario is the largest Australian rules football league in North America.

Cayman Islands
Australian rules is played a few times each year by expatriate Australians and Irishmen in the Cayman Islands.  A number of Australians play in the local Gaelic football competition, and generally the Aussie Rules matches are held between the Australians and Irish on Anzac Day and St Patricks Day each year.

Chile

Australian rules football was first played in Chile in 2002, and was part of an experiment for SPT Gestion Deportiva (a local Sports Marketing company based in Santiago) to introduce new sports into the country and develop business opportunities around it. Adrian Barraza who during that time was part from SPT Gestion Deportiva, contacted two players with previous experience in Australian rules football through the "Big Footy" Internet forum to have a "Kick in the park". Those two players were: Michael "Diesel" Hrzic (from the OC Bombers) and the Chilean Alejandro Dussaillant. Both players met in the USA when they were studying a PhD at the University Wisconsin-Madison and played in the local Australian rules football team. The first "Kick in the park" was held at the Padre Alberto Hurtado Park in late 2002. The same year Barraza was put in contact through the local Australian Embassy with Simon Shalders, an Australian expat owner of a backpackers Hostel called "La Casa Roja" located in downtown Santiago, to explore new ways to develop the sport in the country. Some new "Kicks in the park" were organised between 2002 and 2004, mainly between a group of locals and La Casa Roja's guests but Chilean players' involvement kept low and the sport went into a hiatus.

The first discussions to organise a club were held in late 2007 at a local cricket game by Rob Spurr, who was an Australian expat working in Chile during that time and also was a founder member of the Jakarta Bintangs Australian rules football club from Indonesia.  The country's first organised club, the Santiago Saints, were founded in March 2008 by Rob Spurr and a group of Australian expats and locals, which included among others Adrian Barraza (former SPT Gestion Deportiva partner), Pablo Majias (former Port Adelaide reserves player and current player/coach of the Santiago Saints) and Mario Pavez (a Chilean interchange student who spent a couple of years living in Australia and learnt the sport there). 

The Santiago Saints played their first match against Argentina on July 5, 2008 in a 9 a side format, winning 19.10 (124) to Argentina's 1.5 (11). Continued recruitment of locals saw a Chile vs Anzacs match held in early 2009, the Anzacs consisting of the Saints expatriate players and the Chilean team being all-local.

On June 20, 2009, the Saints travelled to Rio de Janeiro for a match against a side of Australians resident in Brazil dubbed the 'Carnaval', the first ever match to be held on Brazilian soil. The game was again played on a 9 a side format and this time the Santiago Saints team was made by half Chileans and half Australian players. The Chilean team won 14.12.96 to 11.6.72 in a hard-fought game, claiming the inaugural Copa Cabana.

Notable Players

Colombia
The first club formed in Bogotá was the Bulldogs in 2015 and it has grown to include numerous local players and promising junior programs. Colombia played an international in 2016 against Chile. A women's team formed in 2019 and played an internationals against a combined USA and Europe team. The club runs a local competition known as the Colombian Australian Football League (CAFL) with 3 teams however it relies heavily on visiting clubs from the USA for competition and has hosted the Austin Crows and Denver Bulldogs.

Jamaica
A high profile match was played in 1915 by Australian servicemen (Army and Navy) at Sabina Park in Kingston, Jamaica. It was believed to be the first time the sport was played in Jamaica.

Peru

Australian rules is not currently played in Peru, however Peruvian Nick Shipley played in the AFL with the Greater Western Sydney Giants and hoped to inspire other South Americans to take up the sport.

Notable Players

United States

The United States is home to one of the larger communities of Australian rules football clubs and leagues outside Australia, with around 2,000 players and 40 clubs nationwide.  The governing body is the United States Australian Football League.

References

External links
World Footy News - Footy enters Chilean Alternative Sports Scene
Asociacion Argentina De Futbol Australiano

 
Australian rules football outside Australia